The shot put is a track and field event involving "putting" (throwing) a heavy spherical ball—the shot—as far as possible. For men, the sport has been a part of the modern Olympics since their revival (1896), and women's competition began in 1948.

History

Homer mentions competitions of rock throwing by soldiers during the siege of Troy but there is no record of any dead weights being thrown in Greek competitions. The first evidence for stone- or weight-throwing events were in the Scottish Highlands, and date back to approximately the first century. In the 16th century King Henry VIII was noted for his prowess in court competitions of weight and hammer throwing.

The first events resembling the modern shot put likely occurred in the Middle Ages when soldiers held competitions in which they hurled cannonballs. Shot put competitions were first recorded in early 19th century Scotland, and were a part of the British Amateur Championships beginning in 1866.

The distance thrown is measured from the inside of the circumference of the circle to the nearest mark made on the ground by the falling shot, with distances rounded down to the nearest centimetre under IAAF and WMA rules.

Legal throws

The following rules (indoor and outdoor) must be adhered to for a legal throw:
 Upon calling the athlete's name, the athlete may choose any part of the throwing circle to enter inside. They have thirty seconds to commence the throwing motion; otherwise it counts as a forfeit for the current round.
 The athlete may not wear gloves; IAAF rules permit the taping of individual fingers.
 The athlete must rest the shot close to the neck, and keep it tight to the neck throughout the motion.
 The shot must be released above the height of the shoulder, using only one hand.
 The athlete may touch the inside surface of the circle or toe board, but must not touch the top or outside of the circle or toe board, or the ground beyond the circle. Limbs may, however, extend over the lines of the circle in the air.
 The shot must land in the throwing sector, which is a circular sector of 34.92° centered on the throwing circle. The throwing sector has been narrowed multiple times over the years to improve safety, most recently in 2004 from 40°. The current throwing sector angle (34.92°) was chosen because it provides a sector whose bounds are easy to measure and lay out on a field (10 metres out from the center of the ring, 6 metres across).
 The athlete must leave the throwing circle from the back half.
Foul throws occur when an athlete:
 Does not pause within the circle before beginning the putting motion.
 Does not complete the putting movement initiated within thirty seconds of having their name called.
 Allows the shot to drop below his shoulder or outside the vertical plane of his shoulder during the put.
At any time if the shot loses contact with the neck then it is technically an illegal put.
 During the putting motion, touches with any part of the body (including shoes):
 the top or ends of the toe board
 the top of the iron ring
 anywhere outside the circle.
 Puts a shot which either falls outside the throwing sector or touches a sector line on the initial impact.
 Leaves the circle before the shot has landed.
 Does not leave from the rear half of the circle.

Regulation misconceptions
The following are either obsolete or non-existent, but commonly believed rules within professional competition:
 The athlete must enter the circle from the back (none of the rule books contain such a clause).
 The athlete entering the circle, then exiting and re-entering it prior to starting the throw results in a foul (all the rule books allow an athlete to leave a circle prior to starting a throw, but this still counts within the 30 second time limit; the allowable method of exiting the circle varies by rule book).
 Loose clothing, shoelaces, or long hair touching outside the circle during a throw, or an athlete bringing a towel into the circle and then throwing it out prior to the put, results in a foul.

Competition

Shot put competitions have been held at the modern Summer Olympic Games since their inception in 1896, and it is also included as an event in the World Athletics Championships.

Each of these competitions in the modern era have a set number of rounds of throws. Typically there are three qualification rounds to determine qualification for the final. There are then three preliminary rounds in the final with the top eight competitors receiving a further three throws. Each competitor in the final is credited with their longest throw, regardless of whether it was achieved in the preliminary or final three rounds. The competitor with the longest legal put is declared the winner.

Weight
In open competitions the men's shot weighs , and the women's shot weighs . Junior, school, and masters competitions often use different weights of shots, typically below the weights of those used in open competitions; the individual rules for each competition should be consulted in order to determine the correct weights to be used.

Putting styles
Two putting styles are in current general use by shot put competitors: the glide and the spin. With all putting styles, the goal is to release the shot with maximum forward velocity at an angle of slightly less than forty-five degrees.

Glide
The origin of this technique dates to 1951, when Parry O'Brien from the United States invented a technique that involved the putter facing backwards, rotating 180 degrees across the circle, and then tossing the shot. Unlike spin this technique is a linear movement.

With this technique, a right-hand thrower would begin facing the rear of the circle. They would typically adopt a specific type of crouch, involving their bent right leg, in order to begin the throw from a more beneficial posture whilst also isometrically preloading their muscles. The positioning of their bodyweight over their bent leg, which pushes upwards with equal force, generates a preparatory isometric press. The force generated by this press will be channelled into the subsequent throw making it more powerful. To initiate the throw they kick to the front with the left leg, while pushing off forcefully with the right. As the thrower crosses the circle, the hips twist toward the front, the left arm is swung out then pulled back tight, followed by the shoulders, and they then strike in a putting motion with their right arm. The key is to move quickly across the circle with as little air under the feet as possible, hence the name 'glide'.

Spin
This is also known as the rotational technique. It was first practiced in Europe in the 1950s but did not receive much attention until the 1970s. In 1972 Aleksandr Baryshnikov set his first USSR record using a new putting style, the spin ("круговой мах" in Russian), invented by his coach Viktor Alexeyev. The spin involves rotating like a discus thrower and using rotational momentum for power.

With this technique, a right-hand thrower faces the rear, and begins to spin on the ball of the left foot. The thrower comes around and faces the front of the circle and drives the right foot into the center of the circle. Finally, the thrower reaches for the front of the circle with the left foot, twisting the hips and shoulders like in the glide, and puts the shot.

When the athlete executes the spin, the upper body is twisted hard to the right, so the imaginary lines created by the shoulders and hips are no longer parallel. This action builds up torque, and stretches the muscles, creating an involuntary elasticity in the muscles, providing extra power and momentum. When the athlete prepares to release, the left foot is firmly planted, causing the momentum and energy generated to be conserved, pushing the shot in an upward and outward direction.

Another purpose of the spin is to build up a high rotational speed, by swinging the right leg initially, then to bring all the limbs in tightly, similar to a figure skater bringing in their arms while spinning to increase their speed. Once this fast speed is achieved the shot is released, transferring the energy into the shot put.

Until 2016, a woman had never made an Olympic final (top 8) using the spin technique. The first woman to enter a final and win a medal at the Olympics was Anita Márton.

Usage
Currently, most top male shot putters use the spin. However the glide remains popular since the technique leads to greater consistency compared to the rotational technique. Almost all throwers start by using the glide. Tomasz Majewski notes that although most athletes use the spin, he and some other top shot putters achieved success using this classic method (for example he became first to defend the Olympic title in 56 years).

The decision to glide or spin may need to be decided on an individual basis, determined by the thrower's size and power. Short throwers may benefit from the spin and taller throwers may benefit from the glide, but many throwers do not follow this guideline.

Types of shots

The shot is made of different kinds of materials depending on its intended use. Materials used include sand, iron, cast iron, solid steel, stainless steel, brass, and synthetic materials like polyvinyl. Some metals are more dense than others, making the size of the shot vary. For example, different materials are used to make indoor and outdoor shot – because damage to surroundings must be taken into account – so the latter are smaller. There are various size and weight standards for the implement that depend on the age and gender of the competitors as well as the national customs of the governing body.

World records

The current world record holders are:

Continental records
The current records held on each continent are:

All-time top 25

Men (outdoor)
Correct as of September 2022.

Notable series
Ryan Crouser threw 23.12 on 24 June 2022. 23.01, 23.11 and 22.98 (ancillary throws) were recorded for his remaining attempts. This was the first time the 23-metre barrier has been broken more than once in a series.

Women (outdoor)
Correct as of April 2022.

Men (indoor)
Correct as of February 2023.

Notes
Below is a list of all other throws equal or superior to 22.43 m:
Ryan Crouser also threw 22.82 (2021), 22.70 (2021), 22.66 (2021), 22.65 (2021), 22.60 (2020), 22.58 (2020, 2023), 22.48 (2021) and 22.43 (2021).
Randy Barnes also threw 22.66 (1989).
Ulf Timmermann also threw 22.55 (1989).

Women (indoor)
Correct as of May 2022.

Annulled
The following athletes had their performance (inside 21.50 m) annulled due to doping offences:
Nadzeya Ostapchuk 21.70 (2010)

Olympic medalists

Men

Women

World Championship medalists

Men

Women

World Indoor Championships medalists

Men

Women

 Known as the World Indoor Games

Season's bests

Men

Women

See also

Masters shot put
Pundo
Stone put
20 metre club

Notes and references

External links

IAAF shot put homepage
IAAF list of shot-put records in XML

 
Events in track and field
Individual sports
Sports originating in Scotland
Throwing sports
Summer Olympic disciplines in athletics